St. James Lutheran Church may refer to

 Saint James Lutheran Church and School (Lafayette, Indiana)
 St. James Lutheran Church (Pohatcong Township, New Jersey), listed on the NRHP in Warren County, New Jersey
 St. James Lutheran Church (Portland, Oregon), listed on the NRHP in Portland, Oregon
 Saint James Evangelical Lutheran Church in Milwaukee, Wisconsin